The 2001 MTV Europe Music Awards were held in The Festhalle, Frankfurt. The ceremony attracted the largest television audience for the awards until the MTV Europe Music Awards 2007 and was one of the first entertainment broadcasts following the September 11 attacks in New York City.

Performances included Blink-182 with "First Date", Depeche Mode with "Never Let Me Down Again", Rammstein with "Ich Will" and Kylie Minogue with "Can't Get You Out of My Head". Jay-Z performed his track "Girls, Girls, Girls" and Craig David took to the stage with a version of "Walking Away" that sampled U2's "One".

The presenter line up included actress Christina Ricci, girl group Atomic Kitten, Nelly Furtado, Sugababes and Claudia Schiffer.

Nominations
Winners are in bold text.

Regional nominations
Winners are in bold text.

Performances
Kylie Minogue — "Can't Get You Out of My Head"
Dido — "Hunter"
Basement Jaxx — "Where's Your Head At"
Blink-182 — "First Date"
Craig David — "Walking Away"
Mary J. Blige — "Family Affair"
Jay-Z — "Izzo (H.O.V.A.) / Girls, Girls, Girls"
Depeche Mode — "Never Let Me Down Again"
Fred Durst, Wes Scantlin and Jimmy Page — "Thank You"
Rammstein — "Ich Will"
R.E.M. — "Imitation Of Life"
Travis — "Side"

Appearances
Ben Stiller and Claudia Schiffer — presented Best Group
Emma Bunton and Eddy Grant — presented Best Male
Sophie Ellis-Bextor and Bomfunk MC's — presented Best Dance
Kelis and Gavin Rossdale — presented Best Female
Pink and Pedro Almodóvar — presented Best Video
Sugababes and Roger Sanchez — presented The Web Award
Heidi Klum and Boris Becker — presented Best R&B
Xavier Naidoo and Nelly Furtado — presented Best Hip-Hop
Joshua Jackson — presented Free Your Mind Award
Christina Ricci — presented Best Album
Nina Persson and Herbert Gronemeyer — presented Best Pop
Shaggy and Andrea Corr — presented Best New Act
Atomic Kitten and Ronan Keating — presented Best Rock
Alicia Keys and Brendan B. Brown — presented Best Song

See also
2001 MTV Video Music Awards

External links
Nominees

2001
2001 music awards
2000s in Frankfurt
2001 in German music
November 2001 events in Europe